Rajkumar R. Pandey (born 6 October 1972) is an Indian film director, producer, music composer and screenwriter, known for his works in Bhojpuri films. He also big brother of action samrat Manoj R Pandey, He runs his own film production company "Saideep Films".

Rajkumar R. Pandey is also Sr. Vice President of Indian Film & Television Directors’ Association.

Filmography

References

External links

 

Living people
1972 births
Hindi-language film directors
Indian male screenwriters
Hindi film producers
Indian film score composers
Bhojpuri-language film directors
Film directors from Uttar Pradesh
20th-century Indian film directors
21st-century Indian film directors
Film producers from Uttar Pradesh